Lieutenant General Sir Charles Louis Woollcombe  (23 March 1857 – 6 May 1934) was a British Army General during World War I.

Early life and education
Woollcombe was born in Devon, the eldest son of Rev. Louis Woollcombe, Rector of Petrockstowe, and Augusta Rundell Brown. He was educated at Marlborough College. After beginning a career as an accountant, he decided to join the military and in 1876 entered Royal Military College, Sandhurst. He was a member of the football teams at Marlborough and Sandhurst.

Military career
Woollcombe originally served with the 1st Devon Militia, before obtaining a Regular commission in the 46th (South Devonshire) Regiment of Foot in 1876. In 1877, he transferred to the 25th Regiment of Foot, which was retitled as the King's Own Scottish Borderers in 1887. He took part in the Peshawar Valley expedition and the Khyber Line Force in Afghanistan between 1878 and 1880 and in the Chin Lushai expedition in Burma between 1889 and 1890.

He was Deputy Assistant Adjutant General for Musketry in Bengal from 1890 and then Brigade Major for the Chitral Relief Force in Buram in 1895. He then served on the North West Frontier in India becoming Assistant Adjutant General of the Mohmand Field Force in 1897. He then took part in the Tirah expedition from 1897 to 1898 and then became Assistant Adjutant General in India in 1899.

He served in the Second Boer War in South Africa and then became Assistant Adjutant General for Musketry in India between 1901 and 1906.

He became Commander of the Allahabad Brigade in India in 1906, commander of the Garhwal Brigade in India in 1907 and General Officer Commanding the Highland Division in 1911.

On the outbreak of the First World War he was appointed General Officer Commanding-in-Chief of Eastern Command until 7 June 1915 when he became GOC-in-C of 2nd Army, Central Force. Then on 4 July 1916 he took command of 11th (Northern) Division on the Western Front (normally a major-general's command) until 1 December when he became GOC IV Corps. Finally on 29 June 1918 he returned to his post as GOC-in-Chief at Eastern Command: he retired in 1920.

Personal life
In 1886, he married Agnes Meade Murray, youngest daughter of General Sir John Irvine Murray. They had two sons, Malcolm Louis and 2nd Lt. Charles Stephenson, and a daughter, Joan. The younger son was killed in action while serving with his father's regiment, the King's Own Scottish Borderers, at the Battle of La Bassée on 12 October 1914.

He died at his home, Chat Moss, Bexhill-on-Sea, Sussex.

References

 

|-
 

|-
 

|-

|-
 

|-

 

1857 births
1934 deaths
British Army lieutenant generals
People educated at Marlborough College
Graduates of the Royal Military College, Sandhurst
British Army generals of World War I
Knights Commander of the Order of the Bath
Knights Commander of the Order of St Michael and St George
Devon Militia officers
King's Own Scottish Borderers officers
British military personnel of the Tirah campaign
British Army personnel of the Second Boer War
People from Torridge District
Military personnel from Devon